Fibred categories (or fibered categories) are abstract entities in mathematics used to provide a general framework for descent theory. They formalise the various situations in geometry and algebra in which inverse images (or pull-backs) of objects such as vector bundles can be defined. As an example, for each topological space there is the category of vector bundles on the space, and for every continuous map from a topological space X to another topological space Y is associated the pullback functor taking bundles on Y to bundles on X. Fibred categories formalise the system consisting of these categories and inverse image functors. Similar setups appear in various guises in mathematics, in particular in algebraic geometry, which is the context in which fibred categories originally appeared. Fibered categories are used to define stacks, which are fibered categories (over a site) with "descent". Fibrations also play an important role in categorical semantics of type theory, and in particular that of dependent type theories.

Background and motivations
There are many examples in topology and geometry where some types of objects are considered to exist on or above or over some underlying base space. The classical examples include vector bundles, principal bundles, and sheaves over topological spaces. Another example is given by "families" of algebraic varieties parametrised by another variety.

Moreover, it is often the case that the considered "objects on a base space" form a category, or in other words have maps (morphisms) between them. In such cases the inverse image operation is often compatible with composition of these maps between objects, or in more technical terms is a functor. Again, this is the case in examples listed above.

 

Instead, these inverse images are only naturally isomorphic. This introduction of some "slack" in the system of inverse images causes some delicate issues to appear, and it is this set-up that fibred categories formalise.

The main application of fibred categories is in descent theory, concerned with a vast generalisation of "glueing" techniques used in topology. In order to support descent theory of sufficient generality to be applied in non-trivial situations in algebraic geometry the definition of fibred categories is quite general and abstract. However, the underlying intuition is quite straightforward when keeping in mind the basic examples discussed above.

Formal definitions
There are two essentially equivalent technical definitions of fibred categories, both of which will be described below. All discussion in this section ignores the set-theoretical issues related to "large" categories. The discussion can be made completely rigorous by, for example, restricting attention to small categories or by using universes.

Cartesian morphisms and functors

An -functor from an -category  to an -category  is a functor  such that . -categories form in a natural manner a 2-category, with 1-morphisms being -functors, and 2-morphisms being natural transformations between -functors whose components lie in some fibre.

An -functor between two -categories is called a cartesian functor if it takes cartesian morphisms to cartesian morphisms. Cartesian functors between two -categories  form a category , with natural transformations as morphisms.

 

In the important case where  has a terminal object  (thus in particular when  is a topos or the category  of arrows with target  in ) the functor

 

is fully faithful (Lemma 5.7 of Giraud (1964)).

Fibred categories and cloven categories
The technically most flexible and economical definition of fibred categories is based on the concept of cartesian morphisms. It is equivalent to a definition in terms of cleavages, the latter definition being actually the original one presented in Grothendieck (1959); the definition in terms of cartesian morphisms was introduced in Grothendieck (1971) in 1960–1961.

In other words, an -category is a fibred category if inverse images always exist (for morphisms whose codomains are in the range of projection) and are transitive.

The class of morphisms thus selected is called a cleavage and the selected morphisms are called the transport morphisms (of the cleavage). A fibred category together with a cleavage is called a cloven category. Evidently if a cleavage exists, it can be chosen to be normalised; we shall consider only normalised cleavages below.

However, in general it fails to commute strictly with composition of morphisms.

These isomorphisms satisfy the following two compatibilities:
 
 for three consecutive morphisms  and object  the following holds: 
It can be shown (see Grothendieck (1971) section 8) that, inversely, any collection of functors  together with isomorphisms  satisfying the compatibilities above, defines a cloven category. These collections of inverse image functors provide a more intuitive view on fibred categories; and indeed, it was in terms of such compatible inverse image functors that fibred categories were introduced in Grothendieck (1959).

The paper by Gray referred to below makes analogies between these ideas and the notion of  fibration of spaces.

These ideas simplify in the case of groupoids, as shown in the paper of Brown referred to below, which obtains a useful family of exact sequences from a fibration of groupoids.

Splittings and split fibred categories
A (normalised) cleavage such that the composition of two transport morphisms is always a transport morphism is called a splitting, and a fibred category with a splitting is called a split (fibred) category. In other words, the compatibility isomorphisms  of the previous section are all identities for a split category.

Unlike cleavages, not all fibred categories admit splittings. For an example, see below.

Co-cartesian morphisms and co-fibred categories
One can invert the direction of arrows in the definitions above to arrive at corresponding concepts of co-cartesian morphisms, co-fibred categories and split co-fibred categories (or co-split categories). A co-cleavage and a co-splitting are defined similarly, corresponding to direct image functors instead of inverse image functors.

Properties

The 2-categories of fibred categories and split categories

Each such morphism of split -categories is also a morphism of -fibred categories, i.e., .

There is a natural forgetful 2-functor  that simply forgets the splitting.

Existence of equivalent split categories
While not all fibred categories admit a splitting, each fibred category is in fact equivalent to a split category. However, while their composition  is an equivalence (of categories, and indeed of fibred categories), it is not in general a morphism of split categories. Thus the two constructions differ in general. The two preceding constructions of split categories are used in a critical way in the construction of the stack associated to a fibred category (and in particular stack associated to a pre-stack).

Categories fibered in groupoids 
There is a related construction to fibered categories called categories fibered in groupoids. These are fibered categories  such that any subcategory of  given by

 Fix an object 
 The objects of the subcategory are  where 
 The arrows are given by  such that 

is a groupoid denoted . The associated 2-functors from the Grothendieck construction are examples of stacks. In short, the associated functor  sends an object  to the category , and a morphism  induces a functor from the fibered category structure. This association gives a functor  which is a functor of groupoids.

Examples

Fibered categories 

The functor , sending a category to its set of objects, is a fibration. The cartesian arrows are the fully faithful functors.
A choice of a cleavage amounts to a choice of ordinary inverse image (or pull-back) functors for fibre bundles.
This -category is also fibred, and the inverse image functors are the ordinary pull-back functors for vector bundles.
This fibred category can be described as the full sub-category of  consisting of étalé spaces of sheaves.
This can be applied in particular to the "large" topos  of topological spaces.
Quasi-coherent sheaves on schemes: Quasi-coherent sheaves form a fibred category over the category of schemes. This is one of the motivating examples for the definition of fibred categories.
A group homomorphism  can then be considered as a functor, which makes  into a -category. But as is well known in group theory, this is not always possible (one can take the projection in a non-split group extension).
Co-fibred category of sheaves: The direct image functor of sheaves makes the categories of sheaves on topological spaces into a co-fibred category. The transitivity of the direct image shows that this is even naturally co-split.

Category fibered in groupoids 
One of the main examples of categories fibered in groupoids comes from groupoid objects internal to a category . So given a groupoid object

 

there is an associated groupoid object

 

in the category of contravariant functors  from the yoneda embedding. Since this diagram applied to an object  gives a groupoid internal to sets

 

there is an associated small groupoid . Note the fiber category over an object is just the associated groupoid from the original groupoid in sets.

Group quotient 

 

This groupoid gives an induced category fibered in groupoids denoted .

Two-term chain complex 
For an abelian category  any two-term complex

 

has an associated groupoid

 

where

 

this groupoid can then be used to construct a category fibered in groupoids. One notable example of this is in the study of the cotangent complex for local-complete intersections and in the study of exalcomm.

See also
 Grothendieck construction
Stack (mathematics)
Artin's criterion
Fibration of simplicial sets

References

.

External links
SGA 1.VI - Fibered categories and descent - pages 119-153

Category theory